The 2021–22 NCHC men's ice hockey season is the 9th season of play for National Collegiate Hockey Conference and will take place during the 2021–22 NCAA Division I men's ice hockey season. The regular season is set to begin on October 2, 2021 and conclude on March 5, 2022. The conference tournament is scheduled to begin in mid March, 2022.

Coaches
Kris Mayotte was named as Colorado College's 15th head coach shortly after end of their 20–21 season.

Pat Ferschweiler was promoted to head coach after the retirement of Andy Murray.

Records

Standings

Non-Conference record
Of the sixteen teams that are selected to participate in the NCAA tournament, ten will be via at-large bids. Those 10 teams are determined based upon the PairWise rankings. The rankings take into account all games played but are heavily affected by intra-conference results. The result is that teams from leagues which perform better in non-conference are much more likely to receive at-large bids even if they possess inferior records overall.

NCHC had a strong showing against non-conference opponents. As a whole, the league won a majority of their games against every other conference but one (tied with ECAC). While three member teams finished with losing records, the other five more than balanced out the scales. The NCHC also played a good number of games against highly-ranked opponents. While the results in those games was about even, the bonus the teams received from those matches helped put five league members into the NCAA tournament.

Regular season record

Statistics

Leading scorers
GP = Games played; G = Goals; A = Assists; Pts = Points; PIM = Penalties in minutes

Leading goaltenders
Minimum 1/3 of team's minutes played in conference games.

GP = Games played; Min = Minutes played; W = Wins; L = Losses; T = Ties; GA = Goals against; SO = Shutouts; SV% = Save percentage; GAA = Goals against average

Conference tournament

NCAA tournament

Regional semifinal

Midwest

East

Northeast

West

Regional final

Northeast

West

National semifinal

National championship

Ranking

USCHO

USA Today

Pairwise

Note: teams ranked in the top-10 automatically qualify for the NCAA tournament. Teams ranked 11-16 can qualify based upon conference tournament results.

Awards

NCAA

NCHC

NCHC Tournament

NCAA tournament

2022 NHL Entry Draft

† incoming freshman

References

External links

2021-22
NCHC
2021–22